Rodney Afshari (born 1972) is an American personal manager of musical artists.  Rodney grew up in Los Angeles, California.  He has managed musical acts such as Glassjaw, Rock Kills Kid, A Static Lullaby, Alien Ant Farm, Black Light Burns, Vex Red, Chase Pagan, Wild Throne, amongst others.  Rodney currently heads Music Management company Inner Circle Management based in Los Angeles.

Other fields of work 

From 1996-2006, Rodney was a partner and/or promoter of numerous exclusive Manhattan nightclubs and special events.  Veruka, Studio 54, Centrofly, N/A and The Plumm amongst the several nightclubs and semi-private lounges Rodney was involved with.

References

1972 births
Living people
American talent agents